The Konyak people, also known as the Konyak Naga, are a Tibeto-Burmese major Naga ethnic group in the Northeast Indian state of Nagaland. They inhabit the Mon District, which is also known as The Land of the Anghs. The Anghs/Wangs are their traditional chiefs whom they hold in high esteem. Facial tattoos were earned for taking an enemy's head.

Other unique traditional practices that set the Konyaks apart are: gunsmithing,  iron-smelting, brass-works, and gunpowder-making. They are also known for in making excellent Yanglaü (machetes) and wooden sculptures.

Society 
The Konyaks are the largest of the Naga ethnic groups. They are found in Tirap, Longding, and Changlang districts of Arunachal Pradesh; Sibsagar District of Assam; and also in Myanmar. They are known in Arunachal Pradesh as the Wanchos ('Wancho' is a synonymous term for 'Konyak'). Ethnically, culturally, and linguistically the Noctes and Tangsa of the same neighbouring state of Arunachal Pradesh, are also closely related to the Konyaks.
The Konyaks were the last among the Naga ethnic groups to accept Christianity. In the past, they were infamous for attacking nearby villages, often resulting in killings and decapitation of the heads of opposing warriors. The decapitated heads were taken as trophies and usually hung in the 'baan' (a communal house). The number of hunted heads indicated the power of a warrior. The headhunting expeditions were often driven by certain beliefs, such as code of honour and principles of loyalty and sacrifice.

The ethnic members maintain a very disciplined community life with strict adherence to duties and responsibilities assigned to each of them.

Culture

Festival 
Aoleang is a festival celebrated in the first week of April (1–6) to welcome the spring and also to invoke the Almighty's (Kahwang) blessing upon the land before seed-sowing, is the biggest festival of the Konyaks. Another festival, Lao Ong Mo, is the traditional harvest festival celebrated in the months of August/September.

Language 
The Konyak language belongs to the Northern Naga sub-branch of the Sal sub-family of Sino-Tibetan.

Notable people 
 Chingwang Konyak (b. 1943), Member of Parliament, Lok Sabha (1980–1984)
 N. Bongkhao Konyak (b. 1977), Politician from Tobu constituency
 Phangnon Konyak (b. 1978), Member of Parliament, Rajya Sabha (2022–present)
 P. Paiwang Konyak (b. 1977), Cabinet Minister in Nagaland Legislative Assembly
 Noke Wangnao (b. 1948), Member of Nagaland Legislative Assembly
 W. Wangyuh (b. 1963), Former Member of Parliament, Lok Sabha

References

Further reading 
Stirn, Aglaja & Peter van Ham. The Hidden world of the Naga: Living Traditions in Northeast India. London: Prestel.
Oppitz, Michael, Thomas Kaiser, Alban von Stockhausen & Marion Wettstein. 2008. Naga Identities: Changing Local Cultures in the Northeast of India. Gent: Snoeck Publishers.
Kunz, Richard & Vibha Joshi. 2008. Naga – A Forgotten Mountain Region Rediscovered. Basel: Merian.
 Alban von Stockhausen: Imag(in)ing the Nagas: The Pictorial Ethnography of Hans-Eberhard Kauffmann and Christoph von Fürer-Haimendorf. Arnoldsche, Stuttgart 2014,.
 .

External links 

 Ethnologue profile

Scheduled Tribes of India
Naga people
Headhunting